The 1967 NFL season was the 48th regular season of the National Football League. The league expanded to 16 teams with the addition of the New Orleans Saints.

The two 8-team conferences were split into two divisions each: the Eastern Conference divisions were Capitol (Dallas, New Orleans, Philadelphia, and Washington) and Century (Cleveland, New York, Pittsburgh, and St. Louis), and the Western Conference divisions were Central (Chicago, Detroit, Green Bay, and Minnesota) and Coastal (Atlanta, Baltimore, Los Angeles, and San Francisco). Each division winner advanced to the playoffs, expanded to four teams in this year. This was done to allow all Eastern Conference teams to visit New York at least once over the three-year period. Initially the Capitol Division was called the Federal Division when the NFL decided upon the divisions on November 30, 1966.

The NFL season concluded on December 31, when the Green Bay Packers defeated the Dallas Cowboys in the NFL Championship Game (known as the "Ice Bowl").  Two weeks later, on January 14, 1968, the Packers handily defeated the AFL's Oakland Raiders  in Super Bowl II at Miami's Orange Bowl. This was Vince Lombardi's final game as the Packers' head coach. At the time, it was officially the "AFL-NFL World Championship Game," though the more succinct "Super Bowl" was commonly used. The 1965-67 Packers became the 2nd team in NFL history to three-peat, and no one has done it since.

The Baltimore Colts had tied for the NFL's best record in 1967 at 11–1–2, but were excluded from the postseason because of new rules introduced for breaking ties within a division. The L.A. Rams won the division title over Baltimore as a result of the Rams' 34–10 win over Baltimore in the last game of the regular season and a 24–24 tie in Baltimore in mid-October.  L.A. had a 24-point edge over Baltimore in head-to-head meetings, giving them the tiebreaker and the Coastal division title.  The other three division winners had only nine victories each. A total of nine NFL games ended in ties, the most since 1932 – including the two ties in the AFL (considered official NFL records since the merger) makes this the only season since 1932 with ten or more tied games.

The hosts in 1967 were the Capitol and Central division winners for the conference championships (first round), and the Western Conference for the championship game. The 1968 playoff hosts were Century, Coastal, and Eastern, respectively, and 1969 was like 1967.

Draft
The 1967 NFL/AFL draft was held from March 14 to 15 at New York City's Gotham Hotel. With the first pick of the first common draft, the Baltimore Colts selected defensive tackle Bubba Smith from Michigan State.

Expansion Draft
The 1967 NFL expansion draft was held on February 9, 1967, with the New Orleans Saints selecting 42 players from the other NFL teams. The one-year old Atlanta Falcons were exempted from losing a player in this expansion draft.

Major rule changes
The "slingshot" or "tuning fork" goalpost, with one curved support from the ground and offset behind the crossbar, was made standard in the NFL.  This replaced the previous year's offset goalpost, which had two non-curved supports from the ground.  Before the introduction of the offset goalpost, the supports were directly on the goal line. Posts also had to be painted bright gold. 
A  border around the field was also made standard in the league.  Its outer edge designates the closest that non-participants can be to the field, and thus enables the game officials to have a running lane to work in.

Division races
The Eastern Conference was split into the Capitol and Century Divisions, and the Western Conference had the Coastal and Central Divisions. (Each of the new division names began with the letter C and contained seven letters.) Under the new system, each team played six division games (a home-and-away series against teams in its division); a game against each of the other four teams in its conference; and a nonconference game against all of the four members of one of the two four-team divisions in the other conference, for a total of 14 games.  In the past, if two teams were tied for the division lead at season's end, a one-game playoff was conducted to break the tie.  Starting in 1967, a tiebreaking system was implemented that started with net points in head-to-head competition, followed by the team that had less recently played in a title game.  As such, only one team in a division would be the division winner, even if the win–loss record was the same.

Final standings

Tiebreakers
Los Angeles won the Coastal Division based on better point differential in head-to-head games (net 24 points) vs. Baltimore.  The Rams and Colts played to a 24–24 tie in Baltimore in October before the Rams won 34–10 on the season's final Sunday at the Los Angeles Memorial Coliseum. The result would be the same under the modern tiebreaker, which relies first on head-to-head record (Los Angeles won the head-to-head series, 1–0–1).

Postseason

NFL playoffs

AFL–NFL World Championship Game

The Green Bay Packers defeated the Oakland Raiders, league champion of the 1967 American Football League season, 33–14, at Orange Bowl in Miami on January 14, 1968.

Awards

Coaching changes
Detroit Lions: Harry Gilmer was replaced by Joe Schmidt.
Minnesota Vikings: Norm Van Brocklin was replaced by Bud Grant.
New Orleans Saints: Tom Fears became the expansion team's first head coach.

Stadium changes
 The expansion New Orleans Saints began play at Tulane Stadium

References

 NFL Record and Fact Book
 NFL History 1961–1970 (Last accessed December 4, 2005)
 Total Football: The Official Encyclopedia of the National Football League

National Football League
National Football League seasons